The Solomon Islands national under-23 football team, also known as Solympic, represents the Solomon Islands at U23 tournaments. The team is considered to be the feeder team for the Solomon Islands national football team

History 
The Solomon Islands U23 made five appearances so far at the OFC U23 Championship. Their best result was a second place twice, in 1999 and in 2008. In 2015 they will make their sixth appearance during the 2015 Pacific Games.

OFC
The OFC Men's Olympic Qualifying Tournament is a tournament held once every four years to decide the only qualification spot for Oceania Football Confederation (OFC) and representatives at the Olympic Games.

Fixtures & Results

2015

2019

Current squad
The following players were called to the squad for the 2019 OFC Men's Olympic Qualifying Tournament from 21 September - 5 October 2019.
Caps and goals updated as of 5 October 2019 after the match against .

Squad for the 2015 Pacific Games

Squad for the 2012 OFC Men's Olympic Qualifying Football Tournament

List of coaches
  Luke Eroi (2012)
  Patrick Miniti (2015)
  Batram Suri (2019–)

Oceanian national under-23 association football teams
Under-23